Neukirchen is a municipality in the district of Straubing-Bogen in Bavaria, Germany. It is located in the Donau-Wald region in the Bavarian Forest.

Districts 
Neukirchen has 65 districts:

History

Early History 
Neukirchen was first mentioned in 1126 in the deed of the monastery Oberalteich under the name Niuenchirichen. Neukirchen belonged to the  Straubing and the regional court Mitterfels of the Electorate of Bavaria.

Incorporations 
On January 1, 1976, the previously independent municipality Obermühlbach, which had more inhabitants than Neukirchen, incorporated. Dörnau (1979), Birkhof and Rimbach (1980) were reclassified from Hunderdorf to Neukirchen.

Population 

 1961: 1,514 inhabitants
 1970: 1,477 inhabitants
 1987: 1,491 inhabitants
 1991: 1,613 inhabitants
 1995: 1,655 inhabitants
 2000: 1,763 inhabitants
 2005: 1,808 inhabitants
 2010: 1,845 inhabitants
 2015: 1,733 inhabitants

Government 
The Mayor of Neukirchen since March 2008 is Rudolf Seidenader.

Landmarks 

 Neukirchen is a state-approved resort. Noteworthy next to the developed cycling and hiking trails are the circular fruit garden and the nature trail Perlbachtal.
 The parish church of St. Martin is a late Baroque facility with equipment from the construction period in the mid-18th century.
 Haggn Castle

Infrastructure

Education 
There are the following facilities:

 Kindergartens: 50 kindergartens with 62 children (as of 1999)
 Elementary schools: one with four teachers and 59 students (as of 2017/2018)

Roadways 
Neukirchen is located on State Road 2139. In 2017, a Bavaria-wide pilot project to measure the volume of motorcycles was carried out by the Bavarian Police Department. Following the successful completion of the pilot project, the Bavarian Ministry of the Interior decided at the beginning of 2018 to allow the use of noise displays nationwide. Neukirchen, in cooperation with the neighboring municipality of St. Englmar and initiated by council member Matthias Wallner, is taking on a pioneering role in Bavaria in the fight against motorcycle noise.

References

Straubing-Bogen